The grey-collared oriole (Oriolus forsteni), or Seram oriole, is a species of bird in the family Oriolidae. It is endemic to Seram.

Its natural habitat is subtropical or tropical moist lowland forests.

References

grey-collared oriole
Birds of Seram
grey-collared oriole
grey-collared oriole
Taxonomy articles created by Polbot